The Pine City Pioneer  is an American, English language newspaper and the largest of four newspapers in Pine County, Minnesota. It  is headquartered in Pine City and is published weekly on Thursday.

History
The Pine City Pioneer was founded in 1897 as the Pine Poker and has had the following names over the years:
 Pine City Pioneer (1968current)
 Pine Poker-Pioneer (19401968)
 Pine County Pioneer (18851840)
 Pine Poker (18971940)

Other newspapers in Pine County include:
 Askov American in Askov, circulation 1353 in 2019
 Hinckley News in Hinckley, circulation 1081 in 2019
 Pine County Courier in Sandstone, circulation 1308 in 2019

References

External links 
 Pioneer website

Newspapers published in Minnesota
Pine County, Minnesota
1897 establishments in Minnesota
Publications established in 1897